Lake Szelid is a lake in Bács-Kiskun county, Hungary. It contains  of water.

Geography

An unusual salt lake formed from an old branch of the Danube, Lake Szelid can be found 4 km southeast from Dunapataj. The lake, with a maximum width of 200 m and length of 4 km is only three meters deep on average. Thus warms quickly in the summer, sometimes reaching 28 degrees Celsius. Apart from the therapeutic effects of the medicinal salts, the lake is also used for relaxation and fishing. There is a campsite nearby and a sandy beach on the southern side.

References

Szelid, Lake
Geography of Bács-Kiskun County
Tourist attractions in Bács-Kiskun County